A foyer is a type of room, typically an entrance.

Foyer or variation, may refer to:

People
 Bob Foyers (1868–1942), UK soccer player
 Christine Foyer (born 1952), UK botanist
 Jean Foyer (1921–2008), French politician
 Lucien Le Foyer (1872–1952), French politician and pacifist
 Mats Foyer (born 1954), Swedish ambassador to North Korea
 Rozanne Foyer (born 1972), UK trade unionist

Places
 Foyers, Highland, Scotland, UK; a village
 River Foyers, a river emptying into Loch Ness, near Foyers, Highland, Scotland, UK
 Falls of Foyers, a waterfall on Foyers

Other uses
 Foyer S.A., Luxembourg insurance company
 Foyer (housing model), a type of hostelry for laborers
 Le Foyer, French 3-act comedy by Octave Mirabeau

See also

 
 Grand Foyer, White House, Washington, D.C., USA